A by-election for the seat of Bragg in the South Australian House of Assembly was held on 2 July 2022. The by-election was triggered by the parliamentary resignation of Liberal Party MP and former Deputy Premier Vickie Chapman on 31 May 2022. Jack Batty retained the seat for the Liberal Party, despite a modest swing being recorded against the party.

Background

The electorate of Bragg consists of some of the most affluent suburbs in Adelaide's east. As such, it has been a safe seat for the Liberal Party and has always been held by the party or its predecessor, the Liberal and Country League, since its inception in 1970 by at least a 15 percent margin. The 2022 state election saw the closest margin for the Liberals in the seat's history, even though then-incumbent Vickie Chapman still won the seat with 58.2 percent of the two-party-preferred vote, the largest for a Liberal in a metropolitan Adelaide district in the election. Bragg has been represented by three MPs, all of them have been Liberal frontbenchers: David Tonkin, the 38th Premier of South Australia, who held the seat from 1970 to 1983, Graham Ingerson, the 8th Deputy Premier, who held the seat from 1983 to 2002, and Vickie Chapman, the 13th Deputy Premier, who held the seat from 2002 to 2022.

2022 election results

Dates

Candidates

Pre-selections
The Greens selected Jim Bastiras, a University of Adelaide College lecturer and campaigner against the expansion of White Rock Quarry in Horsnell Gully Conservation Park, which is located in the district.

The Liberal Party held its preselection ballot on 5 June. They selected Jack Batty, a lawyer who served as an aide to Christopher Pyne and George Brandis and ran against then-Premier Jay Weatherill in Cheltenham in 2014, with 113 out of 166 votes cast by local party members. Other people seeking preselection for the Liberals included lawyer Melissa Jones who received 33 votes, businesswoman Cara Miller who received 12 votes, and party staffer Sandy Biar who received eight votes. Jones and Miller had also sought preselection in the electoral district of Waite. Chelsey Potter, party staffer who has criticised the party on issues concerning women after alleging sexual assault, also applied for the preselection process but was rejected for not meeting its party membership requirement. After she had considered running in the by-election as an independent, she ultimately declined to do so.

The Labor Party selected Alice Rolls over Rick Sarre, retired academic and Labor's candidate at the 2018 and 2022 state elections. Rolls, who was described by the party secretary as "a lawyer, a Mum and a part-time farmer", was selected at a state party executive meeting on 8 June.

The Family First Party selected Daryl McCann, a teacher and political blogger at publications such as The Australian, The Spectator, and Quadrant. In a post written before the last election, he positioned himself as a "conservative" opponent to then-incumbent Liberal Vickie Chapman and Labor and Greens candidates whom he claimed to be "progressive".

Campaign 
An editor for The Advertiser described the by-election as the first "electoral test" for the Malinauskas government since it took government at the last state election in March. He remarked that campaign posters for Alice Rolls, the Labor candidate, also feature Premier Peter Malinauskas, while Jack Batty, the Liberal candidate campaigned as a “new generation Liberal”.

Result

See also
List of South Australian House of Assembly by-elections

References

South Australian state by-elections
2022 elections in Australia